Thakurganj  railway station serves Thakurganj town in Kishanganj district in the Indian state of Bihar. The Mechi flowing nearby forms the boundary between Nepal and India in the area. On the other side of the border lies Prithivinagar town of Nepal.

Trains
Delhi-Alipurduar Mahananda Express
Sealdah-Alipurduar Kanchan Kanya Express
New Jalpaiguri - Ranchi Weekly Express
Kamakhya-Patna Capital Express
Siliguri Junction-Balurghat Express
Siliguri Junction-Katihar Express
New Jalpaiguri -Rajendra Nagar Capital Express
 Radhikapur–Siliguri Junction DEMU
 Siliguri Junction–Malda Court DEMU
Siliguri Junction–Katihar DEMU

Etymology
The place is named after Rabindra Nath Tagore (Rabindra Nath Thakur in Bengali).

History
Thakurganj Junction was part of Darjeeling Himalayan Railways, Thakurganj Junction was the connecting point of DHR and Outh Tiruhat Railway.

Work for conversion of the Aluabari–Siliguri section from metre gauge to broad gauge was taken up in 2008, train services in the section was suspended and conversion work completed early in 2011.

Manish Kumar joined Thakurganj Station as Station Superintendent in May 2019. Following Staffs are currently working at Thakurganj Railway Station:

(i) Station Superintendent: Manish Kumar

(ii) Station Master: Naresh Kumar Hembrom

(iii) Station Master: Rahul Saha

References

External links
 Trains at Thakurganj

Katihar railway division
Railway stations in Kishanganj district